Tarlok Singh was an Indian long-distance runner who won a gold medal in the 10000 meters and a bronze medal in the 5000 meters runs in the 1962 Jakarta Asian Games. Subsequently, he was affected by tuberculosis because of malnutrition and succumbed to it without nearly receiving any medical treatment.

References

Indian male long-distance runners
Year of birth missing
Year of death missing
Asian Games medalists in athletics (track and field)
Athletes (track and field) at the 1962 Asian Games
Place of birth missing
Asian Games gold medalists for India
Asian Games bronze medalists for India
Medalists at the 1962 Asian Games
Recipients of the Arjuna Award